Hemke is a surname. Notable people with the surname include:

 Frederick Hemke (1935–2019), American saxophonist
 Fritz Hemke (born 1967), American saxophonist

See also
 Henke